Aploconodon is an extinct genus of Late Jurassic mammals belonging to the family Amphidontidae. It contains one species, A. comoensis.

It is present in stratigraphic zone 5 of the Morrison Formation.

See also

 List of prehistoric mammals
 Paleobiota of the Morrison Formation

References

 Foster, J. (2007). Jurassic West: The Dinosaurs of the Morrison Formation and Their World. Indiana University Press. 389pp.

Morrison mammals
Fossil taxa described in 1925
Taxa named by George Gaylord Simpson
Prehistoric mammal genera